James Vasser Jr. (born November 20, 1965) is an American former racing driver. Vasser won the 1996 CART IndyCar championship with Chip Ganassi Racing, and scored ten victories in the series. Vasser was the last American to win the CART championship.

Driving career
Vasser made his CART debut in 1992 and qualified for the Indianapolis 500, setting a record for the fastest qualifying run by a first-year driver. Although he did become a top driver, his rise to prominence coincided with the CART–IRL split, so Vasser's best years were spent away from the Indianapolis 500. He has raced in the event on a one-off basis a few times since, finishing as high as fourth (in the 2001 race.)

Vasser won four races in 1996 and did enough to maintain a lead in the standings for most of the season, clinching the championship at the season's final race. Teammate Alex Zanardi outperformed him over the next two years, winning the points championship both years. Vasser teamed with Juan Pablo Montoya in 1999. He was once again outperformed by his teammate and Montoya won the championship on his rookie season. In 2000, his last year with Chip Ganassi Racing, Vasser won the Houston Grand Prix for his first victory since 1998.

For 2001, Vasser moved to the Patrick Racing team to drive the No. 40 Reynard Toyota. Despite having limited sponsorship for the car at first, Vasser started the season strong with four straight finishes of 4th to 6th place. Continuing the strong start to 2001, Vasser was reunited with Target Chip Ganassi Racing driving for them in the Indianapolis 500. Vasser ran well and finished in 4th place as CART drivers swept the top five spots at the 500. However, once returning to the CART circuit, back to back crashes in race No. 5 at Milwaukee and race No. 6 at Detroit seemed to derail the season as Vasser finished the final sixteen races of the season with only four more finishes of 5th to 7th.

After a disappointing year without even a podium, Vasser was able to secure the seat of the No. 8 Shell Lola Ford with Rahal Letterman Racing for 2002 which had finished 2nd in CART points the previous season. In the Shell car, Vasser showed some muscle at Long Beach scoring the pole, leading laps late, and finishing 2nd behind Michael Andretti. Vasser and Rahal Letterman also crossed over into the IRL where they ran the IRL race in Fontana to prepare for Indianapolis and then the Indianapolis 500. Success was limited as Vasser scored only a 9th at Fontana and a gearbox failure cut short his Indy 500 race. Vasser's 2002 season in the Shell car was much improved over the previous year with Patrick Racing. Vasser really finished the year strong with scoring points in each of the final nine races including a podium at Miami and a dominating win at Fontana after a late-race pass of Andretti. Vasser's Fontana win was to be the final win of his CART career.

Without sponsorship at Rahal for 2003, Vasser had to look for opportunities with other teams and without many seats available for the 38-year-old he ended up with Stefan Johansson's startup American Spirit team. The team was not fully funded and they ran the Reynard chassis which were not up to the pace of the current Lola chassis cars. Additionally, Reynard had gone bankrupt so further development of the chassis had to be taken on by the teams so the performance gap to the Lolas continue to widen during the season. Except for a couple of fourth-place finishes, leading 15 laps at Cleveland, and podium at Surfer's Paradise in a wet/dry race the season was not very successful as rookie teammate Ryan Hunter-Reay was outpacing Vasser. Vasser reunited with Rahal Letterman for his final run at an Indianapolis 500 win but was again sidelined with gearbox failure during the race.

In 2004 he became co-owner of PKV Racing (later renamed to KV Racing Technology) along with Dan Pettit and Kevin Kalkhoven and was a driver for the team. In 2004, he broke the modern CART–Champ Car record for the most consecutive starts. Vasser retired from open wheel racing in 2006, but remains active in his ownership role. He temporarily came out of retirement to drive in the final Champ Car World Series event at the 2008 Toyota Grand Prix of Long Beach.

In 2006, Vasser competed in three Grand-Am Rolex Sports Car Series races, including the 24 Hours of Daytona, driving for GAINSCO/Blackhawk Racing. In 2007, he again drove for the renamed GAINSCO/Bob Stallings Racing at the 24 Hours of Daytona, and on Sept. 4, 2007, it was announced that he would return to the team for the season-ending Sunchaser 1000 km. Vasser drove again for Stallings' team beginning at Laguna Seca in May 2008, pairing with fellow Champ Car champion Cristiano da Matta.

In 2013, Vasser joined the Stadium Super Trucks and was scheduled to make his debut at Honda Indy Toronto. However, he was injured prior to the race and was replaced by Davey Hamilton.

Early career 
Won the 1986 Formula Ford National Championship, SCCA.
Competed in the 1988 Corvette Challenge.
Competed in the 1989 and 1990 Pro F-2000 Canadian Championship.  Vasser and his teammate Ken Murillo were sponsored by LucasFilm.
Competed in Atlantic Championship in 1990 and 1991 for Genoa Racing / Della Penna Motorsports.
Won the Formula Atlantic East/West Challenge in 1990.
Finished Runner-up (by 4 points Jovy Marcelo) in the 1991 season, six wins and seven pole positions.

Motorsports career results

SCCA National Championship Runoffs

American open-wheel racing results
(key)

Indy Lights

CART/Champ Car
{| class="wikitable" style="text-align:center; font-size:90%"
! Year
! Team
! Chassis
! Engine
! 1
! 2
! 3
! 4
! 5
! 6
! 7
! 8
! 9
! 10
! 11
! 12
! 13
! 14
! 15
! 16
! 17
! 18
! 19
! 20
! 21
! Rank
! Points
|-
| 1992
! Hayhoe-Cole Racing
! Lola T92/00
! Chevrolet 265A 
|style="background:#EFCFFF;"|SRF
|style="background:#EFCFFF;"|PHX
|style="background:#CFEAFF;"|LBH
|style="background:#EFCFFF;"|INDY
|DET
|style="background:#EFCFFF;"|POR
|MIL
|NHA
|style="background:#EFCFFF;"|TOR
|MCH
|style="background:#CFCFFF;"|CLE
|ROA
|style="background:#EFCFFF;"|VAN
|style="background:#EFCFFF;"|MDO
|style="background:#DFC484;"|NAZ
|style="background:#CFEAFF;"|LAG
!
!
!
!
!
|style="background:#CFCFFF;"| 22nd
|style="background:#CFCFFF;"| 8
|-
|rowspan=2| 1993
!rowspan=2| Hayhoe-Cole Racing
!rowspan=2| Lola T92/00
! Chevrolet 265A 
|style="background:#EFCFFF;"|SRF
|style="background:#FFDF9F;"|PHX
|style="background:#EFCFFF;"|LBH
|
|style="background:#CFEAFF;"|MIL
|style="background:#EFCFFF;"|DET
|style="background:#CFEAFF;"|POR
|CLE
|colspan=8|
!
!
!
!
!
|rowspan=2 style="background:#CFCFFF;"| 16th
|rowspan=2 style="background:#CFCFFF;"| 30
|-
! Ford XB V8t
|colspan=3|
|style="background:#CFCFFF;"|INDY
|colspan=4|
|style="background:#CFEAFF;"|TOR
|MCH
|style="background:#CFEAFF;"|NHA
|ROA
|style="background:#EFCFFF;"|VAN
|style="background:#CFEAFF;"|MDO
|NAZ
|style="background:#CFCFFF;"|LAG
!
!
!
!
!
|-
| 1994
! Hayhoe-Cole Racing
! Reynard 94i
! Ford XB V8t
|style="background:#DFFFDF;"|SRF
|style="background:#DFFFDF;"|PHX
|style="background:#EFCFFF;"|LBH
|style="background:#DFFFDF;"|INDY
|style="background:#CFEAFF;"|MIL
|style="background:#EFCFFF;"|DET
|style="background:#EFCFFF;"|POR
|style="background:#EFCFFF;"|CLE
|style="background:#EFCFFF;"|TOR
|style="background:#EFCFFF;"|MCH
|style="background:#CFCFFF;"|MDO
|style="background:#CFEAFF;"|NHA
|style="background:#CFCFFF;"|VAN
|style="background:#EFCFFF;"|ROA
|style="background:#CFCFFF;"|NAZ
|style="background:#EFCFFF;"|LAG
!
!
!
!
!
|style="background:#CFCFFF;"| 15th
|style="background:#CFCFFF;"| 42
|-
| 1995
! Chip Ganassi Racing
! Reynard 95i
! Ford XB V8t
|style="background:#CFEAFF;"|MIA
|style="background:#EFCFFF;"|SRF
|style="background:#EFCFFF;"|PHX
|style="background:#EFCFFF;"|LBH
|style="background:#EFCFFF;"|NAZ
|style="background:#EFCFFF;"|INDY
|style="background:#CFEAFF;"|MIL
|style="background:#DFDFDF;"|DET
|style="background:#DFDFDF;"|POR
|style="background:#FFDF9F;"|ROA
|style="background:#EFCFFF;"|TOR
|style="background:#FFDF9F;"|CLE
|style="background:#CFEAFF;"|MCH
|style="background:#CFEAFF;"|MDO
|style="background:#DFFFDF;"|NHA
|style="background:#EFCFFF;"|VAN
|style="background:#CFEAFF;"|LAG
!
!
!
!
|style="background:#CFEAFF;"| 8th
|style="background:#CFEAFF;"| 92
|-
| 1996
! Chip Ganassi Racing
! Reynard 96i
! Honda HRH V8t
|style="background:#FFFFBF;"|MIA
|style="background:#CFEAFF;"|RIO
|style="background:#FFFFBF;"|SRF
|style="background:#FFFFBF;"|LBH
|style="background:#CFEAFF;"|NAZ
|style="background:#FFFFBF;"|500
|style="background:#CFEAFF;"|MIL
|style="background:#CFEAFF;"|DET
|style="background:#CFCFFF;"|POR
|style="background:#CFEAFF;"|CLE
|style="background:#CFEAFF;"|TOR
|style="background:#CFEAFF;"|MCH
|style="background:#DFDFDF;"|MDO
|style="background:#DFFFDF;"|ROA
|style="background:#CFEAFF;"|VAN
|style="background:#DFFFDF;"|LAG
!
!
!
!
!
|style="background:#FFFFBF;"|1st
|style="background:#FFFFBF;"|154
|-
| 1997
! Chip Ganassi Racing
! Reynard 97i
! Honda HRR V8t
|style="background:#FFDF9F;"|MIA
|style="background:#CFEAFF;"|SRF
|style="background:#CFEAFF;"|LBH
|style="background:#DFFFDF;"|NAZ
|style="background:#CFEAFF;"|RIO
|style="background:#DFFFDF;"|GAT
|style="background:#FFDF9F;"|MIL
|style="background:#DFFFDF;"|DET
|style="background:#EFCFFF;"|POR
|style="background:#CFCFFF;"|CLE
|style="background:#CFEAFF;"|TOR
|style="background:#EFCFFF;"|MCH
|style="background:#DFFFDF;"|MDO
|style="background:#CFEAFF;"|ROA
|style="background:#DFDFDF;"|VAN
|style="background:#FFFFBF;"|LAG
|style="background:#DFDFDF;"|FON
!
!
!
!
|style="background:#FFDF9F;"|3rd
|style="background:#FFDF9F;"|144
|-
| 1998
! Chip Ganassi Racing
! Reynard 98i
! Honda HRK V8t
|style="background:#CFCFFF;"|MIA
|style="background:#CFEAFF;"|MOT
|style="background:#CFEAFF;"|LBH
|style="background:#FFFFBF;"|NAZ
|style="background:#DFFFDF;"|RIO
|style="background:#DFFFDF;"|GAT
|style="background:#FFFFBF;"|MIL
|style="background:#DFFFDF;"|DET
|style="background:#CFEAFF;"|POR
|style="background:#CFEAFF;"|CLE
|style="background:#FFDF9F;"|TOR
|style="background:#DFDFDF;"|MCH
|style="background:#EFCFFF;"|MDO
|style="background:#CFEAFF;"|ROA
|style="background:#EFCFFF;"|VAN
|style="background:#DFFFDF;"|LAG
|style="background:#DFFFDF;"|HOU
|style="background:#EFCFFF;"|SRF
|style="background:#FFFFBF;"|FON
!
!
|style="background:#DFDFDF;"|2nd
|style="background:#DFDFDF;"|169
|-
| 1999
! Chip Ganassi Racing
! Reynard 99i
! Honda HRS V8t
|style="background:#DFFFDF;"|MIA
|style="background:#CFEAFF;"|MOT
|style="background:#CFEAFF;"|LBH
|style="background:#CFEAFF;"|NAZ
|style="background:#EFCFFF;"|RIO
|style="background:#CFEAFF;"|GAT
|style="background:#DFFFDF;"|MIL
|style="background:#CFEAFF;"|POR
|style="background:#EFCFFF;"|CLE
|style="background:#EFCFFF;"|ROA
|style="background:#CFEAFF;"|TOR
|style="background:#CFEAFF;"|MCH
|style="background:#DFFFDF;"|DET
|style="background:#DFFFDF;"|MDO
|style="background:#FFDF9F;"|CHI
|style="background:#FFDF9F;"|VAN
|style="background:#EFCFFF;"|LAG
|style="background:#EFCFFF;"|HOU
|style="background:#EFCFFF;"|SRF
|style="background:#DFFFDF;"|FON
!
|style="background:#CFEAFF;"| 9th
|style="background:#CFEAFF;"| 104
|-
| 2000
! Chip Ganassi Racing
! Lola B2K/00
! Toyota RVA V8t
|style="background:#DFFFDF;"|MIA
|style="background:#FFDF9F;"|LBH
|style="background:#DFDFDF;"|RIO
|style="background:#EFCFFF;"|MOT
|style="background:#CFEAFF;"|NAZ
|style="background:#CFCFFF;"|MIL
|style="background:#CFEAFF;"|DET
|style="background:#EFCFFF;"|POR
|style="background:#CFEAFF;"|CLE
|style="background:#CFEAFF;"|TOR
|style="background:#EFCFFF;"|MCH
|style="background:#CFEAFF;"|CHI
|style="background:#EFCFFF;"|MDO
|style="background:#DFFFDF;"|ROA
|style="background:#DFFFDF;"|VAN
|style="background:#CFEAFF;"|LAG
|style="background:#CFEAFF;"|GAT
|style="background:#FFFFBF;"|HOU
|style="background:#FFDF9F;"|SRF
|style="background:#EFCFFF;"|FON
!
|style="background:#CFEAFF;"| 6th
|style="background:#CFEAFF;"| 131
|-
| 2001
! Patrick Racing
! Reynard 01i
! Toyota RV8F V8t
|style="background:#DFFFDF;"|MTY
|style="background:#DFFFDF;"|LBH
|style="background:#FFFFFF;"|TXS
|style="background:#DFFFDF;"|NAZ
|style="background:#DFFFDF;"|MOT
|style="background:#EFCFFF;"|MIL
|style="background:#EFCFFF;"|DET
|style="background:#CFCFFF;"|POR
|style="background:#DFFFDF;"|CLE
|style="background:#EFCFFF;"|TOR
|style="background:#EFCFFF;"|MCH
|style="background:#CFCFFF;"|CHI
|style="background:#EFCFFF;"|MDO
|style="background:#EFCFFF;"|ROA
|style="background:#EFCFFF;"|VAN
|style="background:#CFCFFF;"|LAU
|style="background:#CFEAFF;"|ROC
|style="background:#CFCFFF;"|HOU
|style="background:#DFFFDF;"|LAG
|style="background:#DFFFDF;"|SRF
|style="background:#CFCFFF;"|FON
|style="background:#CFCFFF;"| 12th
|style="background:#CFCFFF;"| 77
|-
| 2002
! Team Rahal
! Lola B02/00
! Ford XF V8t
|style="background:#EFCFFF;"|MTY
|style="background:#DFDFDF;"|LBH
|style="background:#EFCFFF;"|MOT
|style="background:#CFEAFF;"|MIL
|style="background:#CFEAFF;"|LAG
|style="background:#EFCFFF;"|POR
|style="background:#EFCFFF;"|CHI
|style="background:#DFFFDF;"|TOR
|style="background:#DFFFDF;"|CLE
|style="background:#EFCFFF;"|VAN
|style="background:#CFEAFF;"|MDO
|style="background:#DFFFDF;"|ROA
|style="background:#DFFFDF;"|MTL
|style="background:#CFEAFF;"|DEN
|style="background:#CFEAFF;"|ROC|style="background:#FFDF9F;"|MIA
|style="background:#CFEAFF;"|SRF
|style="background:#FFFFBF;"|FON
|style="background:#CFEAFF;"|MXC
!
!
|style="background:#CFEAFF;"| 7th
|style="background:#CFEAFF;"| 114
|-
| 2003
! American Spirit Team Johansson
! Reynard 02i
! Ford XFE V8t
|style="background:#CFEAFF;"|STP
|style="background:#CFCFFF;"|MTY
|style="background:#DFFFDF;"|LBH
|style="background:#EFCFFF;"|BRH
|style="background:#CFEAFF;"|LAU
|style="background:#CFEAFF;"|MIL
|style="background:#CFEAFF;"|LAG
|style="background:#CFEAFF;"|POR
|style="background:#CFCFFF;"|CLE
|style="background:#CFCFFF;"|TOR
|style="background:#EFCFFF;"|VAN
|style="background:#CFEAFF;"|ROA
|style="background:#EFCFFF;"|MDO|style="background:#EFCFFF;"|MTL
|style="background:#CFEAFF;"|DEN
|style="background:#DFFFDF;"|MIA
|style="background:#EFCFFF;"|MXC
|style="background:#FFDF9F;"|SRF
|FON
! 
!
|style="background:#CFCFFF;"| 11th
|style="background:#CFCFFF;"| 72
|-
| 2004
! PKV Racing
! Lola B02/00
! Ford XFE V8t
|style="background:#EFCFFF;"|LBH
|style="background:#EFCFFF;"|MTY
|style="background:#DFFFDF;"|MIL
|style="background:#CFEAFF;"|POR
|style="background:#DFFFDF;"|CLE
|style="background:#DFDFDF;"|TOR
|style="background:#CFEAFF;"|VAN
|style="background:#CFEAFF;"|ROA
|style="background:#EFCFFF;"|DEN
|style="background:#CFEAFF;"|MTL
|style="background:#EFCFFF;"|LAG
|style="background:#DFFFDF;"|LVG
|style="background:#CFCFFF;"|SRF
|style="background:#DFFFDF;"|MXC
!
!
!
!
!
!
!
|style="background:#CFEAFF;"| 8th
|style="background:#CFEAFF;"| 201^
|-
| 2005
! PKV Racing
! Lola B02/00
! Ford XFE V8t
|style="background:#CFEAFF;"|LBH
|style="background:#EFCFFF;"|MTY
|style="background:#DFFFDF;"|MIL
|style="background:#CFEAFF;"|POR
|style="background:#CFEAFF;"|CLE
|style="background:#DFFFDF;"|TOR
|style="background:#CFCFFF;"|EDM
|style="background:#EFCFFF;"|SJO
|style="background:#EFCFFF;"|DEN
|style="background:#CFEAFF;"|MTL
|style="background:#FFDF9F;"|LVG
|style="background:#FFDF9F;"|SRF
|style="background:#CFEAFF;"|MXC
!
!
!
!
!
!
!
!
|style="background:#CFEAFF;"| 6th
|style="background:#CFEAFF;"| 217
|-
| 2006
! PKV Racing
! Lola B03/00
! Ford XFE V8t
|style="background:#EFCFFF;"|LBH
|HOU
|MTY
|MIL
|POR
|CLE
|TOR
|EDM
|SJO
|DEN
|MTL
|ROA
|SRF
|MXC
!
!
!
!
!
!
!
|style="background:#CFCFFF;"| 24th
|style="background:#CFCFFF;"| 7
|}
 ^ New points system implemented in 2004

IndyCar

 1 Run on same day. 2 Non-points-paying, exhibition race.''

Indianapolis 500 results

Notes
 Winner of fastest CART race: Fontana 2002, Average Speed:

NASCAR
(key) (Bold – Pole position awarded by qualifying time. Italics – Pole position earned by points standings or practice time. * – Most laps led.)

Busch Series

References

External links 

 Official bio at PKVRacing.com
 
 Jimmy Vasser now savors taste of Indy milk - The Indianapolis Star, 23 May 2014

Living people
1965 births
People from Canoga Park, Los Angeles
Racing drivers from California
Racing drivers from Los Angeles
24 Hours of Daytona drivers
Indianapolis 500 drivers
Champ Car champions
Champ Car drivers
IndyCar Series drivers
Rolex Sports Car Series drivers
Indy Lights drivers
Atlantic Championship drivers
NASCAR drivers
International Race of Champions drivers
IndyCar Series team owners
SCCA National Championship Runoffs winners
Chip Ganassi Racing drivers
KV Racing Technology drivers
Rahal Letterman Lanigan Racing drivers
American Spirit Team Johansson drivers